Súlovce is a municipality in the Topoľčany District of the Nitra Region, Slovakia. In 2016 it had 494 inhabitants.

References

External links 
Official homepage

Villages and municipalities in Topoľčany District